Kagai may refer to:
 Hanamachi (花街), a geisha district
 Utagaki (歌垣), a peasant gathering
(kagai is a secondary reading of these words)